Joseph R. Mason is an American economist, currently the Hermann Moyse, Jr./Louisiana Bankers Association Endowed Chair of Banking and Russell B. Long Professor in Finance at E. J. Ourso College of Business.

References

Year of birth missing (living people)
Living people
Louisiana State University faculty
University of Illinois alumni
Arizona State University alumni
Economists from Arizona